Christian Henrik Hansen (26 May 1920 – 23 August 2010) was a Danish sport wrestler. He won a bronze medal in Greco-Roman wrestling, welterweight class, at the 1948 Summer Olympics in London. Next year he competed in freestyle wrestling at European championships and placed fifth.

References

1920 births
2010 deaths
Wrestlers at the 1948 Summer Olympics
Danish male sport wrestlers
Olympic wrestlers of Denmark
Olympic bronze medalists for Denmark
Olympic medalists in wrestling
People from Frederiksværk
Medalists at the 1948 Summer Olympics
Sportspeople from the Capital Region of Denmark
20th-century Danish people